Archibald Campbell of Blythswood (1763 –13 June 1838) was a Scottish landowner and politician.

Life
He was born Archibald Douglas, the second son of Col. James Douglas of Mains who inherited the vast Blythswood estate in Glasgow stretching west from Buchanan Street to the River Kelvin in 1767 and was thereafter known as Campbell of Blythswood. His mother was Henrietta Dunlop daughter of James Dunlop of Garnkirk.

On his father's death the estate passed to the first son Lt Col John Campbell, but on John's death, being killed in Martinique in 1794, the estate passed to Archibald, those parts closest to Glasgow now being sold to developers, most notably William Harley, to create the New Town of Blythswood which John Campbell had enabled by Act of Parliament in 1792.

He joined the British Army and was a captain in the 1st Foot in 1790 and was promoted to major in 1794. He retired from the army when he inherited the family estate at Blythswood, Renfrewshire.

He was Senior Bailie for the City of Glasgow from 1802.

He was elected M.P. for Glasgow Burghs 1806–09, Elgin Burghs 1812, Perth Burghs 1818–20, and Glasgow Burghs 1820–31. He served as Lord-lieutenant of Renfrewshire from 1826 to his death and as Rector of Glasgow University from 1809 to 1811.

Campbell was unmarried and on his death the Blythswood lands passed to his second cousin Archibald Douglas of Mains, who also then adopted the surname of Campbell.

Artistic Depictions

A full-length portrait of Campbell was painted by Colvin Smith. A marble bust of Campbell by James Fillans resides in a private collection in this United States while a copy is displayed at the Paisley Sheriff Court in Scotland.

References

External links 
 

1838 deaths
Members of the Parliament of the United Kingdom for Scottish constituencies
UK MPs 1806–1807
UK MPs 1807–1812
UK MPs 1818–1820
UK MPs 1820–1826
UK MPs 1826–1830
UK MPs 1830–1831
Rectors of the University of Glasgow
19th-century Scottish people
Year of birth unknown
Royal Scots officers
18th-century Scottish landowners
Members of the Parliament of the United Kingdom for Glasgow constituencies
Members of the Parliament of the United Kingdom for Dundee constituencies
Lord-Lieutenants of Renfrewshire
Year of birth uncertain
19th-century Scottish landowners
1763 births